Jefea is a genus of North American flowering plants in the family Asteraceae, native to Mexico and the southwestern United States. These are shrubs up to 200 cm (80 inches) tall, with yellow or orange flower heads containing both ray and disc flowers.

 Species
 Jefea brevifolia (A.Gray) Strother - Chihuahua, Coahuila, Nuevo León, Zacatecas, 	San Luis Potosí, Texas, New Mexico
 Jefea gnaphalioides (A.Gray) Strother - Tamaulipas,  Nuevo León
 Jefea lantanifolia (S.Schauer) Strother - Tamaulipas,  Nuevo León, Querétaro, 	San Luis Potosí, Hidalgo
 Jefea pringlei (Greenm.) Strother - Oaxaca, Puebla

 formerly included
see Zexmenia 
 Jefea phyllocephala (Hemsl.) Strother - Zexmenia phyllocephala (Hemsl.) Standl. & Steyerm. - Guatemala

References

Heliantheae
Asteraceae genera
Flora of North America